Sally Ledger (14 December 1961 – 21 January 2009) was a Professor of Victorian literature who made major contributions to the fields of nineteenth-century women’s writing, literary feminism, and the study of Charles Dickens.

Ledger took her undergraduate studies at Queen Mary University of London, where she won the George Smith Prize for the best English First in the University of London in 1985. She completed her graduate studies at the University of Oxford, where she worked on the novels of Mark Rutherford under the supervision of Terry Eagleton at Wadham College. While at Oxford she was involved with the student pressure group Oxford English Limited, and wrote for its journal News from Nowhere: Journal of the Oxford English Faculty Opposition; she also contributed to the journal Literature Teaching Politics, where her first published article appeared in 1987. After her doctorate, Ledger had lectureships at Royal Holloway University of London, the University of Exeter and the University of the West of England before moving to Birkbeck University of London in 1995 as a Lecturer in English. She was promoted to Reader in 2001 and Professor in 2006. Ledger moved to Royal Holloway University of London in 2008 to take up the Hildred Carlile Chair of English.

Professor Ledger’s major publications are The New Woman: Fiction and Feminism at the Fin de Siècle (Manchester University Press, 1997) and Dickens and the Popular Radical Imagination (Cambridge University Press, 2007). She also wrote a study of Henrik Ibsen for Northcote House's 'Writers and Their Work' series (1999), and co-edited a series of volumes: Political Gender: Texts and Contexts (Routledge, 1994), Cultural Politics at the Fin de Siècle (Cambridge University Press, 1995), The Fin de Siècle: A Reader in Cultural History (Oxford University Press, 2000) and the posthumously published Charles Dickens in Context (Cambridge University Press, 2013). She also edited George Egerton’s Keynotes and Discords (Bloomsbury Academic, 2000). From 2005-2009 she was an integral part of the Dickens Project conference at the University of California, Santa Cruz and was planning a book on the origins of Victorian sentimentality at the time of her death. The British Association of Victorian Studies inaugurated the Sally Ledger Memorial Bursary fund for postgraduate students in her honour.

Obituaries
Tom Healy, The Guardian, 28 January 2009

Matthew Reisz, Times Higher Education, 5 February 2009

Roger Luckhurst, The Independent, 7 February 2009

References

1961 births
2009 deaths
Academics of Royal Holloway, University of London
British women academics